Shaina Horenstein (11 January 1904 – 13 September 1942) was the youngest daughter of Rabbi Yosef Yitzchak Schneersohn, the sixth Rebbe of the Chabad Hasidic movement. In the Chabad community, she is referred to as Rebbitzin Shaina.

Biography
Sheina Horenstein was born Sheina Schnnersohn, the youngest daughter of Rabbi Yosef Yitzchak Schneersohn, the sixth Rebbe of the Chabad, and Nechama Dinah Schneersohn. As with many members of the Schneersohn dynasty, Sheina is referred to as "Rebbitzin Sheina" by many Chabad Hasidim.

Rebbitzin Sheina married Menachem Mendel Horenstein on Tuesday, 14 June 1932 (Hebrew: Sivan 10, 5692). Her wedding was attended by many notable rabbis and Hasidic Rebbes. After the wedding, the couple moved to Paris, where they lived until 1939.

Sheina and her husband were killed by the Nazis during World War II in Treblinka. Mordechai Unrad testified that he had been in Treblinka with the Horensteins and that Sheina was killed on the 2nd Day of Rosh Hashanah, 1942.

Memorial

The tomb of Sheina's older sister, Chaya Mushka Schneerson, contains a dedication to her death during the holocaust. The tomb is visited regularly by Chabad Hasidim.

References

External links
Handwritten invitation to Sheina's Wedding by Rabbi Yosef Yitzchak Schneersohn on Kedem Auction House

Chabad-Lubavitch (Hasidic dynasty)
1904 births
1942 deaths
Polish Jews who died in the Holocaust
Polish people who died in Treblinka extermination camp